is a Japanese actor. He won the award for best actor at the 24th Yokohama Film Festival for The Laughing Frog.

Filmography

Film

Television

References

External links

1945 births
Living people
Japanese male actors
People from Tokyo